Charles Foden (1868 – 14 October 1908) was a British tug of war competitor. At the 1908 Summer Olympics, he won a silver medal in the tug of war event as the captain of the British team, Liverpool Police, for whom he worked as a superintendent.

Charles was also a superb marksman and often practised in his spare time with a miniature rifle. On 14 October 1908, his body was discovered on the police athletic grounds in Liverpool with a gunshot wound through the heart, and his rifle was found nearby. An inquest into his death was held, but it could not be determined if he had committed suicide. 

At his funeral, his coffin was carried to its final place of rest by six members of the tug of war team.

References

1868 births
1908 deaths
Olympic tug of war competitors of Great Britain
Tug of war competitors at the 1908 Summer Olympics
Olympic silver medallists for Great Britain
Olympic medalists in tug of war
British police officers

Medalists at the 1908 Summer Olympics